Sphingomonas oligoaromativorans  is a Gram-negative, strictly aerobic, oligotrophic and non-motile bacteria from the genus of Sphingomonas which has been isolated from humus forest soil in the Gyeryong Mountain National Park in Korea.

References

Further reading

External links
Type strain of Sphingomonas oligoaromativorans at BacDive -  the Bacterial Diversity Metadatabase

oligoaromativorans
Bacteria described in 2014